Mark William Peters (born 4 October 1983) is an English retired football forward, who began his career as a youth at Southampton, before transferring to Brentford, where he made appearances in the Football League. Following his departure in 2004, he embarked on a nomadic career in non-league football. Peters was capped by England C at international level in 2006.

Playing career

Southampton 
Peters began his career with Premier League club Southampton at the age of 11 and signed his first professional contract in October 2000. He scored 32 goals for the youth team during the 2000–01 season. Despite earning comparisons to Alan Shearer, Peters never made an appearance for the first team and a broken ankle suffered in 2001 hindered his progress. Peters departed the club in February 2002.

Brentford 
Peters joined Second Division promotion challengers Brentford in February 2002 and signed a two-and-half-year contract. He was not picked for the first team under Steve Coppell during the 2001–02 season and instead played for the reserves. Peters made his professional debut when he came on as a substitute for Mark McCammon after 77 minutes of a 1–1 draw with Port Vale. He christened his maiden start for the club with his first goal, in a 2–1 West London derby defeat versus Queens Park Rangers on 19 April. Peters finished the 2002–03 season having made 12 appearances and scored one goal.
  
Peters had a transfer request granted in October 2003, after expressing frustration at his lack of first team opportunities and the non-materialisation of a loan move to Conference club Aldershot Town one month earlier. After the sacking of Wally Downes and the arrival of new manager Martin Allen, Peters was released in March 2004. He made only 12 first team appearances during the 2003–04 season, though he was the top scorer for the reserve team. During his two years with the Bees, Peters made 24 appearances and scored one goal.

Farnborough Town 
Peters signed for Conference club Farnborough Town in March 2004. He made three appearances before leaving the club on 15 April 2004.

Frimley Green 
Peters dropped down to the Combined Counties League Premier Division to sign for hometown club Frimley Green during the 2004 off-season. He began the 2004–05 season in prolific form and scored six goals in seven games before departing the club on 8 November 2004.

Hornchurch 
After a period on trial at Woking, Peters joined Conference South club Hornchurch on 8 November 2004. He made just one appearance for the club.

Return to Frimley Green 
Peters returned to Frimley Green in mid-November 2004 and made seven appearances, scoring eight goals, before departing the club in March 2005. Peters scored 14 goals in as many games during his time with the Green in the 2004–05 season.

Carshalton Athletic 
Peters signed for Conference South strugglers Carshalton Athletic in March 2005. Peters made 10 appearances and scored one goal for the Robins in what remained of the 2004–05 season and left the club at the end of the campaign.

Basingstoke Town 
Peters joined Conference South club Basingstoke Town in July 2005. A falling out with manager Ernie Howe saw Peters leave the club in November 2005, after making 14 appearances and scoring 8 goals.

Eastleigh 
Peters signed trial forms with Conference South club Eastleigh in November 2005. He made four appearances and scored one goal before being released in early December.

AFC Wimbledon 
Peters joined Isthmian League Premier Division high fliers AFC Wimbledon on 5 December 2005. He made six appearances for the club without scoring before departing on 2 February 2006.

Third spell at Frimley Green 
Peters returned to hometown club Frimley Green in March 2006 and finished his third spell with the club with 14 goals in 12 games.

Return to Basingstoke Town 
Peters re-signed for Basingstoke Town in July 2006. He made eight appearances and scored two goals for the club before departing in October 2006.

Gosport Borough 
Peters signed a dual-registration deal with Wessex League Premier Division club Gosport Borough on 11 October 2006. He scored four goals in his four appearances for the club.

Walton & Hersham 
Peters signed for Isthmian League First Division South club Walton & Hersham during the 2007 off-season. He left the club in December, after making 11 appearances and scoring five goals.

Fourth spell at Frimley Green 
Peters went back home to join Frimley Green (now playing Combined Counties League First Division football) for a fourth time in December 2007. He made 22 appearances and scored 14 goals in the second half of the 2007–08 season. He stayed on with the club for the 2008–09 season and made 23 appearances, scoring 9 goals. Peters made 45 appearances and scored 23 goals during his fourth spell with the Green.

Badshot Lea 
Peters moved back up to the Combined Counties League Premier Division to sign for Badshot Lea in the summer of 2009. He ended the 2009–10 season with 18 goals in 35 appearances. He made 17 appearances and scored one goal during the 2010–11 season and five goals in 22 appearances during 2011–12.

International career 
Peters' form for Basingstoke Town won him a call up to the England C team in a friendly versus Conference club Forest Green Rovers on 5 September 2006. Peters began the match as a substitute and came on for Yemi Odubade after 65 minutes of the 1–0 defeat.

Career statistics

References

External links

1983 births
Living people
English footballers
Association football forwards
Brentford F.C. players
English Football League players
National League (English football) players
Farnborough F.C. players
Frimley Green F.C. players
Hornchurch F.C. players
Carshalton Athletic F.C. players
Basingstoke Town F.C. players
Eastleigh F.C. players
AFC Wimbledon players
Gosport Borough F.C. players
Walton & Hersham F.C. players
Badshot Lea F.C. players
England semi-pro international footballers
Isthmian League players